The 2023 FIBA Under-19 Women's Basketball World Cup is a tournament organised by FIBA for women's youth national teams aged 19 years old and below. The tournament will be hosted in Madrid, Spain, from 15 to 23 July 2023.

Qualified teams

Draw
The draw will take place in 27 March 2023.

Seeding
On 20 March 2023, the pots were announced.

References

2023
FIBA Under-19 Women's Basketball World Cup
FIBA
2023 in Madrid
FIBA
FIBA
Sports competitions in Madrid
FIBA
FIBA Under-19
FIBA